Herviella is a genus of small sea slugs, aolid nudibranchs, marine gastropod mollusks in the family Facelinidae.

Species
Species within the genus Herviella include:
 Herviella affinis Baba, 1960
 Herviella africana Edmunds, 1970
 Herviella albida Baba, 1966
 Herviella burchi Burn, 1967
 Herviella claror Burn, 1963
 Herviella cloaca Rudman, 1980
 Herviella evelinae (Er. Marcus, 1965)
 Herviella exigua (Risbec, 1928)
 Herviella mietta Marcus & Burch, 1965
 Herviella yatsui (Baba, 1930)

References

External links

Facelinidae